Mississippi Highway 182 (MS 182) designates the old two-lane highway for U.S. Route 82 (US 82) where the current US 82 occupies a new right-of-way. Some of the towns with a segment of MS 182 are Winona, Kilmichael, Eupora, Mayhew, Starkville, and Columbus.

Route description

Winona

MS 182 begins at an intersection with US 82 in the western part of Winona in Montgomery County. From here, the highway heads east along two-lane undivided Middleton Road, passing through wooded areas of homes. MS 182 comes to its eastern terminus at an intersection with US 51.

Kilmichael

MS 182 begins at a junction with US 82 northwest of Kilmichael in Montgomery County, heading southeast on a two-lane undivided road through woodedland. The road enters Kilmichael and becomes North Rutherford Drive, passing through wooded areas with homes. The highway intersects the southern terminus of MS 745 near the center of town and continues past more residences on South Rutherford Drive. MS 182 comes to an intersection with the northern termini of both MS 413 and MS 745 and turns to the east. The highway runs through a mix of fields, trees, and homes before it reaches its eastern terminus at US 82 east of Kilmichael.

Eupora

MS 182 begins at an intersection with US 82 west of Eupora in Webster County, heading northeast as a two-lane undivided road. The road passes through a mix of fields and woods with some homes before it curves east and enters Eupora. The highway becomes West Roane Avenue and runs through residential areas. MS 182 heads into the commercial downtown of Eupora, where it becomes East Roane Avenue and crosses MS 9. Past this intersection, the road continues past businesses a short distance to the north of the Columbus and Greenville Railway before it leaves Eupora. The highway becomes unnamed and runs through wooded areas with some fields and homes, curving northeast away from the railroad tracks. MS 182 comes to its eastern end at another intersection with US 82.

Starkville-Mayhew and western Columbus

MS 182 begins at an intersection with US 82 west of Starkville in Oktibbeha County, heading southeast as a two-lane undivided road. The highway runs through forested areas with some fields and homes, passing through the community of Adaton. The road continues through rural areas and curves east. MS 182 enters Starkville and comes to an interchange with MS 25. At this interchange, the highway becomes a four-lane road called Dr. Martin Luther King, Jr. Drive West and passes commercial development before it narrows back to two lanes and runs through wooded areas with homes and businesses. The road continues east through more commercial areas as it passes to the north of downtown Starkville, with the name changing to Dr. Martin Luther King, Jr. Drive East at the Dr. Douglas L. Conner Drive intersection. MS 182 gains a center left-turn lane and intersects the southern terminus of MS 389 a short distance later. The highway passes more businesses and comes to a bridge over a Kansas City Southern Railway line. MS 182 widens into a four-lane divided highway and comes to an interchange with MS 12 on the eastern border of Starkville. After this, the road passes through the northern portion of the Mississippi State University campus.

MS 182 becomes an unnamed divided highway and runs between fields to the north and residential and commercial development to the south of the road. The highway comes to an interchange with the US 82/MS 12/MS 25 freeway in Clayton Village, after which it narrows back into a two-lane undivided road that runs through rural land with some commercial development. The road passes to the south of the Mississippi State University Golf Course before it crosses under US 82/MS 12/MS 25 without an interchange. MS 182 runs through a mix of farm fields and woods with some homes as it heads into Lowndes County. The highway becomes South Frontage Road and reaches an interchange with US 45 Alt. Following this, the road continues through rural land before it reaches the community of Mayhew, where it heads to the north of the East Mississippi Community College Golden Triangle Campus and passes under a Kansas City Southern Railway line. MS 182 runs through woods before continuing straight through farmland. Before the road reaches the roadbed of the US 82/MS 12 freeway, the MS 182 designation formally ends with the roadbed continuing only as Frontage Road.

Past this intersection, the road becomes Old Highway 82 West and runs through wooded areas with some fields. MS 182 comes to its terminus just west of the Tennessee–Tombigbee Waterway to the west of Columbus, where the road turns south and becomes Old Macon Road.

Columbus-Alabama

MS 182 begins at a dead end along the western shore of a large island along the Tennessee–Tombigbee Waterway in Columbus, Lowndes County, heading east along two-lane undivided Island Road. The highway passes homes and businesses, turning northeast and passing over the eastern branch of the Tennessee–Tombigbee Waterway. After this bridge, MS 182 comes to an intersection with MS 69, at which point the highway turns southeast to form a concurrency with MS 69 along four-lane divided Main Street. The road soon curves east and heads into the commercial downtown of Columbus. The highway leaves the downtown area and continues past businesses and some homes, becoming a five-lane road with a center left-turn lane and crossing a Kansas City Southern Railway line. MS 69/MS 182 curves northeast, narrowing to three lanes, before turning back east and crossing an Alabama and Gulf Coast Railway line. The roadway continues through commercial areas and passes to the south of a park, becoming a four-lane undivided road, before crossing Luxapallila Creek. MS 69 splits from MS 182 by heading to the south, while MS 182 continues east along Alabama Street, a three-lane road with a center left-turn lane, past businesses along with a few residences. Farther east, the highway leaves Columbus and becomes a two-lane undivided, unnamed road that runs through woodland with some fields and development. The road runs near residential neighborhoods before it intersects Lee Stokes Road, which heads north to an interchange with US 82. MS 182 continues east to its terminus at the Alabama border, where the road continues into that state as CR-30 in Pickens County.

Major intersections

Winona

Kilmichael

Eupora

Starkville-Columbus

Columbus-Alabama

See also

References

External links

Magnolia Meanderings

182
U.S. Route 82
Transportation in Montgomery County, Mississippi
Transportation in Webster County, Mississippi
Transportation in Oktibbeha County, Mississippi
Transportation in Lowndes County, Mississippi